Beautiful Friendship may refer to:
 Beautiful Friendship (Elise Wood & John Hicks album), 2000
 Beautiful Friendship (The Three Sounds album), 1965
 Beautiful Friendship, a 1970 album by Continental Uptight Band
 Beautiful Friendship, a 2006 album by The Drummonds
 Beautiful Friendship, a 1989 album by Mike Nock
 "Beautiful Friendship", a song by Ernest Tubb and Loretta Lynn, from the album Singin' Again

See also 
 A Beautiful Friendship (disambiguation)